Rant is the 10th solo studio album by Ian Hunter and also his most political one in 25 years. Unlike his last three albums which were more collaborative, Hunter wrote all the tracks by himself.

Track listing
All tracks written by Ian Hunter.

UK version
"Ripoff" – 4:50
"Good Samaritan" – 4:07
"Death of a Nation" – 5:35
"Purgatory" – 4:46
"American Spy" – 4:30
"Dead Man Walkin' (Eastenders)" – 6:20
"Wash Us Away" – 3:57
"Morons" – 5:32
"Soap 'N' Water" – 5:18
"Knees of My Heart" – 3:35
"No One" – 3:37
"Still Love Rock 'n' Roll" – 4:34

US version
"Still Love Rock 'n' Roll" – 4:34
"Wash Us Away" – 3:57
"Death of a Nation" – 5:35
"Morons" – 5:32
"Purgatory" – 4:46
"American Spy" – 4:30
"Dead Man Walkin' (Eastenders)" – 6:20
"Good Samaritan" – 4:07
"Soap 'N' Water" – 5:18
"Ripoff" – 4:50
"Knees of My Heart" – 3:35
"No One" – 3:37

Personnel
Ian Hunter - vocals, keyboards, harmonica, acoustic guitar, piano, backing vocals
Andy York - electric guitar, mandoguitar, groovebox, autoharp, organ, zither, keyboards, mandolin, bass, backing vocals
Steve Holley - drums, percussion
Robbie Alter - guitars, bass, piano
Tommy Mandel - organ, keyboards, loops
Mickey Curry - drums
John Conte - bass
Rich Pagano - backing vocals, bongos, drums
James Mastro - six-string fuzzbass, mandolin, electric slide, electric 12-string, acoustic 12-string
Dane Clark - drums
Doug Petty - organ, keyboards
Jesse Hunter Patterson - gang vocals
Lisa Ronson - gang vocals
Willie Nile - gang vocals
Rick Tedesco - guitar, gang vocals

References

2001 albums
Ian Hunter (singer) albums